HMS Hardy was an anti-submarine warfare frigate of the  or Type 14. Hardy was the first Type 14 frigate built, completed on 8 December 1955, by Yarrow Shipbuilders.

Operational Service

On commissioning Hardy served in the Third Training Squadron at Londonderry Port before transferring to the Second Training Squadron in Portland in 1957. In 1960 she underwent a major modernisation and refit, before joining the Twentieth Frigate Squadron in Londonderry Port.  In 1967 Hardy transferred to the Second Frigate Squadron and attended Portsmouth Navy Days.  The after 40 mm guns in these ships were removed early in their careers due to hull strengthening problems.

Icelandic Patrol and the First Cod War.

Serving mainly in the Londonderry Port and Portland areas, Hardy attended the 1977 Silver Jubilee Fleet Review off Spithead when she was part of the 2nd Frigate Squadron.

She paid off to the Standby Squadron in August 1977, then, after another short spell of operational service at Portland, became a stores accommodation ship in Portsmouth in October 1979.

Hardy by name and hardy by nature: she was used as a target for Exocet and Sea Skua missiles and her bow was blown off by a torpedo. Following being shelled by 4.5" rounds and receiving patterns of anti submarine mortar charges set to shallow depth, both the main portion of the ship and the separated bow section were finally sunk, by the use of 20mm cannons fired from HMS Charybdis, in the Western Approaches 3 July 1984.

References

Publications
 
 

 

1953 ships
Blackwood-class frigates